Elachista evexa is a moth of the family Elachistidae. It is found in New South Wales, Australia.

The wingspan is about 12 mm for males and 11.4–12 mm for females. The forewings are pale yellowish to greyish white with some scattered grey scales. The hindwings are grey with an ochreous white fringe.

References

Moths described in 2011
evexa
Moths of Australia
Taxa named by Lauri Kaila